Decker Brothers was an American piano manufacturer located in the John H. Edelmann designed Decker Building in  New York, New York, on the national register of historic places. The company began to produce pianos in 1865, created by David Decker and John Decker, after the brothers were awarded many piano patents.

The Company 
The Decker Brothers pianos are known for their exceptional quality in knowledgeable piano circles, and The New York Times wrote that they had "a wide spread and enviable reputation for their superior quality". However, they did not achieve the notability of some of their counterparts, specifically Steinway & Sons and Chickering and Sons, even though widely acknowledged as being equivalent in quality to the Steinway and Chickering pianos of the era. Today the Decker Brothers pianos do not sell for as much as their more famous counterparts, yet they still command more than double the price of an average piano manufacturer of that era.

The company ended its operations at the death of one of the brothers around the turn of the 20th century.

The Piano 
The Decker Brothers piano had typical late square action and dampers, but very good scaling ahead of its day. A Decker Brothers piano has been more recently described as having "the most unusual design in the bass." This is because the strings go under the plate at the tuning pin end with the tuning pin sticking up through a hole.  It is guessed that this was done in order to get the string coil closer to the pinblock and so to have more of the tuning pin actually in the pinblock.

References 

Piano manufacturing companies of the United States
Musical instrument manufacturing companies based in New York City
Defunct manufacturing companies based in New York City